The South African cricket team toured India between 26 March and 13 April 2008, playing 3 Tests against India. The series was tied 1–1.

Squads

Test series

1st Test

2nd Test

3rd Test

References

External links
 South African cricket team in India in 2007–08 at ESPN Cricinfo

2008 in Indian cricket
2008 in South African cricket
Indian cricket seasons from 2000–01
International cricket competitions in 2007–08
2007–08